The Tengyur or Tanjur or Bstan-’gyur (Tibetan: "Translation of Teachings") is the Tibetan collection of commentaries to the Buddhist teachings, or "Translated Treatises".

The Buddhist Canon

To the Tengyur were assigned commentaries to both Sutras and Tantras, treatises and abhidharma works (both Mahayana and non-Mahayana).

Together with the 108-volume Kangyur (the Collection of the Words of the Buddha), these form the basis of the Tibetan Buddhist canon. "The Kangyur usually takes up a hundred or a hundred and eight volumes, the Tengyur two hundred and twenty-five, and the two together contain 4,569 works."

As example, the content of the Beijing Tengyur:

 Stotras ("Hymns of Praise"): 1 Volume; 64 texts.
 Commentaries on the Tantras: 86 Volumes; 3055 texts.
 Commentaries on Sutras; 137 Volumes; 567 texts.

 Prajnaparamita Commentaries, 16 Volumes.
 Madhyamika Treatises, 29 Volumes.
 Yogacara Treatises, 29 Volumes.
 Abhidharma, 8 Volumes.
 Miscellaneous Texts, 4 Volumes.
 Vinaya Commentaries, 16 Volumes.
 Tales and Dramas, 4 Volumes.
 Technical Treatises, 43 Volumes.

The Bön Tengyur 
The Tibetan Bön religion, under the influence of Buddhism, also has its canon literature divided into two sections called the Kangyur and Tengyur but the number and contents of the collection are not yet fully known. Apparently, Bön began to take more on a literary form about the time Buddhism began to enter Tibet, although it could have had some written register some time before that.

See also
 Buddhism
 Kangyur

Footnotes

References
 Schlagintweit, Emil (2006) Buddhism in Tibet: Illustrated by Literary Documents and Objects Of Religious Worship With An Account Of The Buddhist Systems Preceding It In India 
 Stein, R. A. (1962) Tibetan Civilization. First English edition - translated by J. E. Stapleton Driver (1972). Reprint (1972): Stanford University Press, Stanford, California  (cloth); 
 Tucci, Giuseppe. The Religions of Tibet. (1970). First English edition, translated by Geoffrey Samuel (1980). Reprint: (1988), University of California Press  (cloth);  (pbk)

External links 
 AIBS' Tengyur translation initiative
 Resources for Kanjur & Tanjur Studies ~ Universität Wien
 ACIP's Derge Tengyur etext
 TBRC's Tengyur scans
Translation of texts

Tibetan Buddhist treatises
Tripiṭaka